Coimbra Sports, previously Coimbra Esporte Clube, commonly known as Coimbra, is a Brazilian football club based in Contagem, Minas Gerais state.

History
The club was founded on 5 January 1986. The club competed for the first time in a professional competition in 2010, when they participated in the Campeonato Mineiro Segunda Divisão, being eliminated in the First Stage of the competition.

They won the 2018 Campeonato Mineiro-Segunda Divisão and the 2019 Campeonato Mineiro-Módulo II. In 2020 they played for first time the Campeonato Mineiro.

Stadium
Coimbra Sports play their home games at Centro de Treinamentos Flávio Pentagna Guimarães. They played their 2020 Campeonato Mineiro home matches at Estádio Independência.

References

Association football clubs established in 1986
Football clubs in Minas Gerais
1986 establishments in Brazil